The railway from Bordeaux to Sète is an important French 476-kilometre long railway line, that connects the southwestern port city Bordeaux (on the Bay of Biscay) to the southern port Sète (on the Mediterranean) via Toulouse and Narbonne. The railway was opened in several stages between 1855 and 1858.

Route
The Bordeaux–Sète railway leaves the Bordeaux-Saint-Jean station in southeastern direction, following the river Garonne upstream on its left bank. It crosses the Garonne at Langon, and continues upstream along the right Garonne bank in eastern direction, turning southeast near La Réole. It crosses the river Lot near Aiguillon, and passes through Agen. At Castelsarrasin the railway leaves the Garonne and runs east towards Montauban on the river Tarn, where it turns sharply southeast, and then south to Toulouse.

At Toulouse the railway leaves the Garonne again, following the small river Hers-Mort in southeastern direction. Beyond Carcassonne it follows the river Aude downstream, in eastern direction. At Narbonne the railway turns northeast until Béziers, where it turns east. At Agde it reaches the Mediterranean Sea coast, and runs northeast along the spit that separates the Étang de Thau from the sea. It reaches its eastern terminus Sète after 476 km.

Main stations

The main stations on the Bordeaux–Sète railway are:
 Bordeaux-Saint-Jean station 
 Agen station
 Montauban-Ville-Bourbon station
 Toulouse-Matabiau station
 Carcassonne station
 Narbonne station
 Béziers station
 Sète station

History

The railway was built by the Compagnie des Chemins de fer du Midi. The first section that was opened in 1855 led from Bordeaux to Tonneins. The section between Tonneins and Toulouse was opened in 1856. In 1857 the line was extended to near Sète. Finally in 1858 the line was connected with the existing PLM line from Sète to Montpellier.

Services

The Bordeaux–Sète railway is used by the following passenger services:
TGV from Paris to Toulouse on the section between Bordeaux and Toulouse 
AVE from Barcelona to Toulouse on the section between Toulouse and Narbonne
Intercités from Paris to Toulouse and Perpignan on the section between Montauban and Narbonne, from Nantes to Toulouse on the section between Bordeaux and Toulouse and from Bordeaux to Marseille and Nice on the whole line 
TER Nouvelle-Aquitaine and TER Occitanie regional services on the whole line

References

Railway lines in Nouvelle-Aquitaine
Railway lines in Occitania (administrative region)
Railway lines opened in 1855
1855 establishments in France